Fort Towson is a town in Choctaw County, Oklahoma, United States. The population was 510 at the 2010 census, a 15.1 percent decline from the figure of 611 recorded in 2000. It was named for nearby Fort Towson, which had been established in May 1824 and named for General Nathan Towson, a hero of the War of 1812. The town of Fort Towson was established in 1902, after the Arkansas and Choctaw Railway reached eastern Choctaw County.

History
The fort was first established to protect the southern border of the Indian Territory against Spanish colonies to the south. After Indian Removal and the resettlement of the Choctaw in the area, the fort was revived to protect Doaksville, a mile to the west. It became the economic capital of the Choctaw Nation. Fort Towson Landing was located at the head of navigable waters of the Red River. The site was located in Towson County, one of the constituent counties comprising the Apukshunnubbee District of the Choctaw Nation.

The Choctaw allied with the Confederacy in the Civil War. Chief Peter Pitchlynn surrendered on behalf of the Choctaw in June 1865.

Fort Towson was the site of the surrender of the last Confederate land forces in the American Civil War. On 23 June 1865, Brigadier General Stand Watie, a Cherokee chief, agreed to terms and took his Choctaw Battalion out of the war.

During the 1950s, Raymond Gary Lake and Raymond Gary State Park were created, and in 1979, Fort Towson's town limits were extended to include the lake's residents. Thus, the 1980 census recorded a population of 789.

Geography
Fort Towson is located at  (34.020042, -95.279374). It is east of Hugo.

Demographics

As of the census of 2000, there were 611 people, 255 households, and 181 families residing in the town. There were 319 housing units at an average density of 57.3 per square mile (22.1/km2). The racial makeup of the town was 86.42% White, 1.15% African American, 8.02% Native American, 0.49% Asian, 0.16% from other races, and 3.76% from two or more races. Hispanic or Latino of any race were 2.29% of the population.

There were 255 households, out of which 28.6% had children under the age of 18 living with them, 55.7% were married couples living together, 12.2% had a female householder with no husband present, and 29.0% were non-families. 26.7% of all households were made up of individuals, and 14.5% had someone living alone who was 65 years of age or older. The average household size was 2.40 and the average family size was 2.87.

In the town, the population was spread out, with 25.0% under the age of 18, 6.2% from 18 to 24, 22.7% from 25 to 44, 27.7% from 45 to 64, and 18.3% who were 65 years of age or older. The median age was 42 years. For every 100 females, there were 85.7 males. For every 100 females age 18 and over, there were 86.9 males.

The median income for a household in the town was $19,676, and the median income for a family was $21,705. Males had a median income of $19,583 versus $16,389 for females. The per capita income for the town was $12,612. About 25.1% of families and 31.7% of the population were below the poverty line, including 99.9% of those under age 18 and 184.1% of those age 65 or over.

NRHP Sites

 Doaksville Site
 Fort Towson
 Spencer Academy
 Willie W. Wilson House

Notable person
Frank Abercrombie, Baseball player

References

External links
City of Fort Towson Official Website
Choctaw County: Official Website
 Encyclopedia of Oklahoma History and Culture - Fort Towson (town)

Towns in Choctaw County, Oklahoma
Towns in Oklahoma